We Got the Time, is the second studio album by Danish-teen girl pop duo, Creamy, released in 2000. It was first released on CD in 2000, and later for digital download on March 3, 2003. The album was certified 2× platinum for sales of more than 100,000 copies.

Track listing 
 "I Do, I Do, I Do"
 "Help! I'm a Fish"
 "We Got The Time"
 "Little Kitty" (cover of Walkers song)
 "Fantasy Island" (feat. Maribel The Mermaid of The All Movement Frequency & The Destinies)
 "Never Ending Story"
 "Little 1"
 "Bye Bye Bike"
 "Do You Think I'm Pretty?"
 "Fantasy Spaceship"
 "It Can Happen To You"
 "Ice Cream"

Chart positions

References

Creamy albums
2000 albums